The 1949 Tasmanian Australian National Football League (TANFL) premiership season was an Australian Rules football competition staged in Hobart, Tasmania over fifteen (15) roster rounds and four (4) finals series matches between 30 April and 24 September 1949.

Participating Clubs
Clarence District Football Club
Hobart Football Club
New Norfolk District Football Club
New Town District Football Club
North Hobart Football Club
Sandy Bay Football Club

1949 TANFL Club Coaches
Bert Edwards (Clarence)
Cecil Geappen (Hobart)
Albert 'Tich' Edwards (New Norfolk)
Roy Cazaly (New Town)
Roy Quinn (North Hobart)
Ernie Pilkington (Sandy Bay)

TANFL Reserves Grand Final
Nth Hobart 8.11 (59) v Hobart 6.7 (43) – North Hobart Oval

TANFL Under-19's Grand Final
State Schools Old Boys Football Association (SSOBFA) – (Saturday, 10 September 1949) 
 Buckingham 13.15 (93) v North West 1.5 (11) – New Town Oval.
Note: Buckingham were affiliated to New Town, North West were affiliated to North Hobart.

State Grand Final
(Saturday, 1 October 1949)
Nth Launceston: 4.4 (28) | 5.8 (38) | 7.11 (53) | 13.17 (95)
New Town: 1.2 (8) | 3.4 (22) | 7.6 (48) | 8.7 (55)
Attendance: 8,407 at York Park
Note: More than 2,500 patrons also entered the ground without paying, swelling the crowd to more than 11,000.

Intrastate Matches
Jubilee Shield (Saturday, 28 May 1949)
 NTFA 19.5 (119) v TANFL 11.16 (82) – Att: 11,000 at York Park

Jubilee Shield (Saturday, 2 July 1949)
NWFU 13.13 (91) v TANFL 11.14 (80) – Att: 6,500 at Devonport Oval

Jubilee Shield (Saturday, 6 August 1949)
 NTFA 16.12 (108) v TANFL 13.12 (90) – Att: 11,284 at North Hobart Oval

Inter-Association Match (Saturday, 28 May 1949)
TANFL 15.22 (112) v Huon FA 7.10 (52) – Att: 1,300 at Huonville Recreation Ground

Interstate Match
Exhibition Match (Saturday, 2 July 1949)
Claremont 17.17 (119) v TANFL 14.12 (96) – Att: 2,988 at North Hobart Oval

Leading Goalkickers: TANFL
Albert Park (New Town) – 69
B.Reading (Hobart) – 34
Bobby Parsons (New Town) – 31
Noel Reid (Nth Hobart) – 29

Medal Winners
Hamish Yaxley (Clarence) – William Leitch Medal
Rex Garwood (Buckingham) – V.A Geard Medal (Under-19's)

1949 TANFL Ladder

Round 1
(Saturday, 30 April 1949)
Hobart 7.14 (56) v New Town 7.11 (53) – Att: 4,880 at North Hobart Oval
Nth Hobart 13.13 (91) v Sandy Bay 12.8 (80) – Att: 2,451 at Queenborough Oval
New Norfolk 11.9 (75) v Clarence 9.13 (67) – Att: 1,100 at Bellerive Oval

Round 2
(Saturday, 7 May 1949)
New Norfolk 13.17 (95) v Sandy Bay 10.14 (74) – Att: 2,579 at North Hobart Oval
Nth Hobart 21.9 (135) v New Town 7.15 (57) – Att: 2,560 at New Town Oval
Hobart 10.16 (76) v Clarence 5.13 (43) – Att: 1,323 at TCA Ground

Round 3
(Saturday, 14 May 1949)
Nth Hobart 10.14 (74) v Clarence 10.8 (68) – Att: 2,910 at North Hobart Oval
New Town 14.11 (95) v Sandy Bay 10.12 (72) – Att: 2,560 at New Town Oval
New Norfolk 10.6 (66) v Hobart 4.11 (35) – Att: 2,577 at Boyer Oval

Round 4
(Saturday, 21 May 1949)
Hobart 14.8 (92) v Nth Hobart 10.15 (75) – Att: 4,810 at North Hobart Oval
New Town 14.17 (101) v New Norfolk 7.14 (56) – Att: 3,318 at New Town Oval
Sandy Bay 10.23 (83) v Clarence 6.10 (46) – Att: 1,767 at Bellerive Oval

Round 5
(Saturday, 4 June 1949)
New Town 10.19 (79) v Clarence 5.9 (39) – Att: 2,453 at North Hobart Oval
Hobart 10.19 (79) v Sandy Bay 7.18 (60) – Att: 2,609 at TCA Ground
New Norfolk 6.10 (46) v Nth Hobart 6.4 (40) – Att: 2,102 at Boyer Oval

Round 6
(Saturday, 11 June & Monday, 13 June 1949)
Nth Hobart 7.9 (51) v Sandy Bay 4.14 (38) – Att: 5,096 at North Hobart Oval
New Norfolk 9.13 (67) v Clarence 5.6 (36) – Att: 1,285 at Boyer Oval
Hobart 12.19 (91) v New Town 11.9 (75) – Att: 8,760 at North Hobart Oval (Monday) *
Note: All-time record roster match attendance for Hobart Football Club.

Round 7
(Saturday, 18 June 1949)
New Town 15.10 (100) v Nth Hobart 6.8 (44) – Att: 4,954 at North Hobart Oval
Hobart 11.18 (84) v Clarence 9.10 (64) – Att: 1,123 at Bellerive Oval
Sandy Bay 9.10 (64) v New Norfolk 5.10 (40) – Att: 2,227 at Queenborough Oval

Round 8
(Saturday, 25 June 1949)
Hobart 12.12 (84) v New Norfolk 5.7 (37) – Att: 3,370 at North Hobart Oval
New Town 15.21 (111) v Sandy Bay 7.14 (56) – Att: 3,157 at New Town Oval
Nth Hobart 17.15 (117) v Clarence 6.16 (52) – Att: 1,083 at TCA Ground

Round 9
(Saturday, 9 July 1949)
New Town 18.11 (119) v New Norfolk 10.9 (69) – Att: 2,720 at North Hobart Oval
Hobart 9.15 (69) v Nth Hobart 9.14 (68) – Att: 2,701 at TCA Ground
Sandy Bay 10.13 (73) v Clarence 10.6 (66) – Att: 1,206 at Queenborough Oval

Round 10
(Saturday, 16 July 1949)
Nth Hobart 11.11 (77) v New Norfolk 10.9 (69) – Att: 3,057 at North Hobart Oval
Hobart 8.10 (58) v Sandy Bay 7.7 (49) – Att: 2,620 at Queenborough Oval
New Town 17.16 (118) v Clarence 7.13 (55) – Att: 1,236 at Bellerive Oval

Round 11
(Saturday, 23 July 1949)
Nth Hobart 11.10 (76) v Sandy Bay 9.10 (64) – Att: 2,586 at North Hobart Oval
Hobart 12.8 (80) v New Town 5.24 (54) – Att: 4,166 at TCA Ground
New Norfolk 13.14 (92) v Clarence 11.8 (74) – Att: 917 at Bellerive Oval

Round 12
(Saturday, 30 July 1949)
Hobart 12.12 (84) v Clarence 9.10 (64) – Att: 1,654 at North Hobart Oval
New Town 15.18 (108) v Nth Hobart 11.10 (76) – Att: 4,003 at New Town Oval
New Norfolk 22.11 (143) v Sandy Bay 10.9 (69) – Att: 1,710 at Boyer Oval

Round 13
(Saturday, 13 August 1949)
New Town 15.17 (107) v Sandy Bay 8.12 (60) – Att: 2,797 at North Hobart Oval
Hobart 11.13 (79) v New Norfolk 9.17 (71) – Att: 2,462 at TCA Ground
Clarence 9.7 (61) v Nth Hobart 8.12 (60) – Att: 1,152 at Bellerive Oval

Round 14
(Saturday, 20 August 1949)
Hobart 14.12 (96) v Nth Hobart 7.11 (53) – Att: 2,943 at North Hobart Oval
Sandy Bay 11.18 (84) v Clarence 10.8 (68) – Att: 800 at TCA Ground
New Town 8.7 (55) v New Norfolk 8.0 (48) – Att: 1,794 at Boyer Oval

Round 15
(Saturday, 27 August 1949)
Hobart 9.9 (63) v Sandy Bay 7.11 (53) – Att: 2,535 at North Hobart Oval
New Town 14.20 (104) v Clarence 6.6 (42) – Att: 1,442 at New Town Oval
New Norfolk 10.13 (73) v Nth Hobart 6.10 (46) – Att: 1,407 at Boyer Oval

First Semi Final
(Saturday, 3 September 1949)
Nth Hobart: 4.4 (28) | 10.6 (66) | 10.9 (69) | 11.14 (80)
New Norfolk: 2.7 (19) | 5.10 (40) | 8.12 (60) | 10.16 (76)
Attendance: 7,386 at North Hobart Oval

Second Semi Final
(Saturday, 10 September 1949)
New Town: 2.5 (17) | 3.6 (24) | 6.6 (42) | 11.12 (78)
Hobart: 2.4 (16) | 5.6 (36) | 8.10 (58) | 9.12 (66)
Attendance: 8,504 at North Hobart Oval

Preliminary Final
(Saturday, 17 September 1949)
Hobart: 2.3 (15) | 9.8 (62) | 11.10 (76) | 16.11 (107)
Nth Hobart: 1.4 (10) | 4.5 (29) | 7.10 (52) | 8.15 (63)
Attendance: 10,736 at North Hobart Oval

Grand Final
(Saturday, 24 September 1949)
New Town: 2.1 (13) | 5.2 (32) | 6.4 (40) | 10.8 (68)
Hobart: 1.2 (8) | 2.6 (18) | 2.10 (22) | 4.12 (36)
Attendance: 15,086 at North Hobart Oval

References

All scores and statistics courtesy of the Hobart Mercury publications.

Tasmanian Football League seasons